Redwood County is a county in the U.S. state of Minnesota. As of the 2020 census the population was 15,425. Its county seat is Redwood Falls, along the Redwood River near its confluence with the Minnesota River.

The Lower Sioux Indian Reservation (also known as the Mdewakankton Tribal Reservation) is entirely within the county, along the southern bank of the Minnesota River in Paxton and Sherman townships. In the 2000 census it had a population of 335.

History
The Minnesota Legislature created the county on February 8, 1862, with Redwood Falls as the county seat. It was named for the Redwood River, which flows eastward through the county.

Geography
The Minnesota River flows southeast along the county's northeastern border. The Redwood River flows east through the upper part of the county, draining into the Minnesota near Redwood Falls. The Cottonwood River flows east through the lower part of the county, entering adjacent Brown County before discharging into the Minnesota. The county terrain consists of rolling hills, carved with drainages and sprinkled with lakes. The largely rural area is devoted to commodity crops of corn and soybeans.

Airports
 Redwood Falls Municipal Airport (RWF)

Major highways

  U.S. Highway 14
  U.S. Highway 71
  Minnesota State Highway 19
  Minnesota State Highway 67
  Minnesota State Highway 68
  Minnesota State Highway 330

Adjacent counties

 Renville County - northeast
 Brown County - east
 Cottonwood County - south
 Murray County - southwest
 Lyon County - west
 Yellow Medicine County - northwest

Lakes

 Daubs Lake
 Gales Lake
 Lake Francis
 Lake Redwood
 Long Lake
 Three Lakes
 Tiger Lake

Protected areas

 Alexander Ramsey State Park
 Cedar Mountain Scientific and Natural Area
 Cedar Rock Scientific and Natural Area
 Daubs Lake State Wildlife Management Area
 Delhi State Wildlife Management Area
 Gales State Wildlife Management Area
 Honner State Wildlife Management Area
 Klabunde State Wildlife Management Area
 Luescher-Barnum State Wildlife Management Area
 Mammenga State Wildlife Management Area
 Paul State Wildlife Management Area
 Rohlik State Wildlife Management Area
 Swedes Forest Scientific and Natural Area (part)
 Waterbury State Wildlife Management Area
 Westline State Wildlife Management Area
 Willow Lake State Wildlife Management Area

Demographics

2000 census
As of the 2000 census, the county had 16,815 people, 6,674 households, and 4,524 families. The population density was 19.1/sqmi (7.39/km2). There were 7,230 housing units at an average density of 8.23/sqmi (3.18/km2). The county's racial makeup was 94.97% White, 0.13% Black or African American, 3.24% Native American, 0.32% Asian, 0.07% Pacific Islander, 0.43% from other races, and 0.85% from two or more races. 1.14% of the population were Hispanic or Latino of any race. 55.8% were of German and 13.7% Norwegian ancestry.

There were 6,674 households, of which 31.50% had children under the age of 18 living with them, 57.30% were married couples living together, 7.10% had a female householder with no husband present, and 32.20% were non-families. 28.80% of all households were made up of individuals, and 14.70% had someone living alone who was 65 years of age or older. The average household size was 2.44 and the average family size was 3.02.

26.50% of the county's population was under age 18, 6.60% was from age 18 to 24, 24.80% was from age 25 to 44, 22.70% was from age 45 to 64, and 19.30% was age 65 or older. The median age was 40 years. For every 100 females there were 99.70 males. For every 100 females age 18 and over, there were 96.50 males.

The county's median household income was $37,352, and the median family income was $46,250. Males had a median income of $30,251 versus $21,481 for females. The county's per capita income was $18,903. About 5.50% of families and 7.70% of the population were below the poverty line, including 8.30% of those under age 18 and 8.80% of those age 65 or over.

2020 Census

Communities

Cities

 Belview
 Clements
 Delhi
 Lamberton
 Lucan
 Milroy
 Morgan
 Redwood Falls (county seat)
 Revere
 Sanborn
 Seaforth
 Vesta
 Wabasso
 Walnut Grove
 Wanda

Unincorporated Communities
 Gilfillan
 Lower Sioux Indian Community
 Morton (part)
 Rowena

Townships

 Brookville Township
 Charlestown Township
 Delhi Township
 Gales Township
 Granite Rock Township
 Honner Township
 Johnsonville Township
 Kintire Township
 Lamberton Township
 Morgan Township
 New Avon Township
 North Hero Township
 Paxton Township
 Redwood Falls Township
 Sheridan Township
 Sherman Township
 Springdale Township
 Sundown Township
 Swedes Forest Township
 Three Lakes Township
 Underwood Township
 Vail Township
 Vesta Township
 Waterbury Township
 Westline Township
 Willow Lake Township

Politics
Redwood County is a reliably Republican precinct. In only one national election since 1948 has the county selected the Democratic Party candidate (as of 2020).

See also
 National Register of Historic Places listings in Redwood County, Minnesota

Footnotes

Further reading
 Franklyn Curtiss-Wedge, The History of Redwood County, Minnesota.'' In Two Volumes. Chicago: H.C. Cooper Jr. and Co., 1916. [https://archive.org/details/historyofredwood01curt Volume 1 | Volume 2

External links
 Redwood County government's website

 
Minnesota counties
1862 establishments in Minnesota
Populated places established in 1862